Jagera may refer to:

 Jagera people, an Aboriginal Australian people
 Jagera language, an Aboriginal Australian language
 Jagera (plant), a genus of trees

See also 
 Jagara (disambiguation)